Tetanopsyrus is a genus of Acanthodii. There are two species of this genus that lived through the lower Devonian (Lochkovian), some 416 to 359 million years ago.

Tetanopsyrus lindoei

Authority: Gagnier, Hanke and Wilson, 1999

Size: Length: 4 cm

Remains: Holotype (UALVP 39078): articulated skeleton.

Referred Materials: UALVP 32571, 38682, and 43026.

Age and Distribution: Horizon: lower Devonian (Lochkovian).

Locality: MOTH locality outcrop in the Mackenzie Mountains, western Northwest Territories, Canada.

Classification: Acanthodii Diplacanthiiformes Tetanopsyridae

Tetanopsyrus breviacanthias

Authority: Hanke, Davis and Wilson, 2001

Size: Length: 4 cm

Remains: (UALVP 43246): articulated skeleton

Referred Materials: UALVP 39062 (partial); UALVP 42512; UALVP 43089 (juvenile); UALVP 44030 (juvenile); UALVP 45153

Age and Distribution: Horizon: lower Devonian (Lochkovian)

Locality: MOTH locality outcrop in the Mackenzie Mountains, western Northwest Territories, Canada.

Classification: Acanthodii Diplacanthiiformes Tetanopsyridae

References 

Acanthodii genera
Fossils of British Columbia